Burn the Witch (stylized as BURN ☩HE WITCH) is a Japanese manga series written and illustrated by Tite Kubo. It was first published in Shueisha's Weekly Shōnen Jump as a one-shot chapter in July 2018. A serialized continuation of the one-shot is being published in the same magazine with a seasonal release schedule. The 4-chapter first season was published from August to September 2020. A second season of the manga has been announced. An anime film produced by Studio Colorido premiered in October 2020. The series' title comes from a 2016 song by the English band Radiohead.

Synopsis
The story of Burn the Witch takes place in the Bleach universe and follows two witches, Noel Niihashi and Ninny Spangcole, working for the Western Branch of Soul Society, located in Reverse London.

Characters

Media

Manga
Burn the Witch is written and illustrated by Tite Kubo. A 62-pages one-shot was first published in the 33rd issue of Shueisha's Weekly Shōnen Jump on July 14, 2018. In March 2020, it was announced that a miniseries would be published in Weekly Shōnen Jump as a companion for the also announced film. Burn the Witch'''s "first season" is a continuation of the one-shot chapter, and ran in the Weekly Shōnen Jump for four weeks, from August 24 to September 14, 2020. A "second season" was announced with the release of the first season's final chapter. Shueisha published the series' first season in a 260-page tankōbon volume, that included the one-shot chapter, on October 2, 2020. 

Viz Media published the one-chapter in Weekly Shonen Jump on July 16, 2018. Viz Media simultaneously released the English-language version of the series. In February 2021, Viz Media announced that they will release the first volume of Burn the Witch in English. It was published on October 19, 2021.

Volume list

Film
In March 2020, it was announced that the series would receive an anime film adaptation by Studio Colorido, directed by Tatsuro Kawano. The film is distributed by Shochiku and premiered on October 2, 2020, in Japan. The theme song for the film is "Blowing", performed by Nil. The film also streamed in other territories outside Asia, with a different version from the Japanese theatrical release. Crunchyroll streamed the film in a 3-episode format on October 1, 2020. Viz Media released the series on home video. In Southeast Asia and South Asia, Muse Communication has licensed the film and released it on YouTube.

Other media
In October 2020, the series collaborated with mobile game Bleach: Brave Souls, featuring Ninny and Noel as playable characters. Brave Souls x Burn the Witch collaboration merchandise was also given out to 150 random people who interacted with the game's Twitter account. A year later, a 2nd round of the collaboration debuted, introducing Bruno Bangnyfe as a new character with the previous two returning; it was followed by a 3rd round. The series had a crossover event with Oasis' mobile game Bleach: Immortal Soul in May 2022, featuring Nini and Noel as characters.

ReceptionBurn the Witchs first volume sold 86,066 print copies in its first week and 68,810 print copies in its second week.

Skyler Allen of The Fandom Post wrote that despite lacking the same "spark" as Bleachs beginning, the Burn the Witch'' one-shot is still enjoyable and has plenty of potential for growth in a full serialization, but too much time is spent on its setup to work as a standalone story. He had strong praise for Kubo's art and memorable character designs, but criticized the one-shot as "unfocused" for ideas that did not get properly fleshed out.

References

Further reading

External links
 
 

2020 anime films
2020 action films
2020 fantasy films
2018 manga
2020 manga
Action anime and manga
Animated films about dragons
Animated films set in London
Anime action films
Anime films based on manga
Bleach (manga)
Books about dragons
Comics about magic 
Comics set in London
Crunchyroll anime
Fantasy anime and manga
Films about witchcraft 
Japanese animated fantasy films
Japanese fantasy action films
Muse Communication
Shochiku films
Shueisha manga
Shōnen manga
Studio Colorido
Viz Media manga
Witchcraft in anime and manga
Witchcraft in written fiction